The Women's tournament of the volleyball competition of the 2015 African Games was held from September 4–15, 2015 in Brazzaville.

Teams

Preliminary round

Group A

|}

|}

Group B

|}

|}

Final round

Semifinals

|}

Third place game

|}

Final

|}

See also
Volleyball at the 2015 African Games – Men's tournament

External links
Results

References

Volleyball at the 2015 African Games